Saint-Hilaire-sur-Helpe (literally Saint-Hilaire on Helpe) is a commune in the Nord department in northern France.

Geography

Climate

Saint-Hilaire-sur-Helpe has a oceanic climate (Köppen climate classification Cfb).

Heraldry

See also
Communes of the Nord department

References

Sainthilairesurhelpe